Blood for Blood is an American hardcore punk band.

Blood for Blood may also refer to:
Blood for Blood (Aria album) or Krov za krov
Blood for Blood (Hellyeah album)
Blood for Blood (1935 film) or Khoon Ka Khoon
Blood for Blood (1995 film) or Midnight Man